Jamil Baloch (born 12 June 1972) is a Pakistani sculptor. His work narrates the impact of social and political barriers upon the society. He works in multiple mediums. He is currently teaching at National College of Arts Lahore.

Life and education 
Jamil Baloch was born on June 12, 1972 in Nushki, Baluchistan. He got early education from Nushki. He graduated from National College of Arts Lahore in 1997.

Art career 
Jamil Baloch works signify different behaviors of a society. Belongs from a rich cultural heritage he incorporate the traditional models with modernity in his art. Most of his earlier works interpret violence and cruelty of power and continuous attempt for survival by mankind.

He always explores diverse mediums. He has been artist in resident Vermont Studio Center, USA. He is also awarded by Rangoonwala Award in national Exhibition of Visual Arts in 2003, Karachi and Honorable Prize International Art Biennale in 2008, Bangladesh.

References

External links 
 https://web.archive.org/web/20120425051836/http://adapk.com/disorientation-the-work-of-jamil-baloch/index.html
 https://web.archive.org/web/20120425051838/http://www.thedrawingroom.com.pk:888/artgallery.php?id=23
 http://www.khaasgallery.com/TheCollectionKhaasArtist.aspx?AID=278
 http://gandhara-art.com/artist-bio.php?aid=78
 http://www.artchowk.com/Views/artists/artists_profile.php?id=31
 http://www.vaslart.org/xhtml/artdir/contemporary/List%20J/jamil_baloch/
 https://web.archive.org/web/20090509211803/http://jang.com.pk/thenews/jun2008-weekly/nos-01-06-2008/enc.htm#4
 http://www.thenews.com.pk/TodaysPrintDetail.aspx?ID=24134&Cat=6

1972 births
Living people
Baloch people
National College of Arts alumni
Pakistani sculptors
People from Nushki District